Minle station is a station on Line 4 of the Shenzhen Metro. It opened on 16 June 2011.

Station layout

Exits

References

External links
 Shenzhen Metro Minle Station (Chinese)
 Shenzhen Metro Minle Station (English)

Railway stations in Guangdong
Shenzhen Metro stations
Longhua District, Shenzhen
Railway stations in China opened in 2011